Diadegma curvicaudis is a wasp first described by Szepligeti in 1916.
No subspecies are listed.

References

crataegi
Insects described in 1916